The Thai Raksa Chart Party, officially known in English as the Thai Save the Nation Party, was a Thai political party established in 2009 as minor party under the name Rath Thai Party.

History 
The party underwent a series of name changes throughout its existence, renaming itself to Thai Ruamphalang Party in 2010 before adopting its current name per the decision of the party's assembly at its convention in 2018. It had been observed  that the party serves as a "backup party" for Pheu Thai Party, as several former Pheu Thai MPs and ministers had confirmed to join the party for the 2019 Thai general election.

The party's inaugural convention was held on 7 November 2018 at the Rama Gardens Hotel in Bangkok. The party debuted its new name and logo design similar to the Pheu Thai Party's logo, but with the "ท" letter featuring a circle in lieu of a triangle at the upper left. First Lieutenant Preechapol Phongpanich and Mr. Mitti Tiyapairat were elected to become the party's leader and secretary-general respectively.

Dissolution 
On 8 February 2019, the party announced the nomination of Princess Ubolratana as its sole candidate for prime minister in the upcoming election. This unprecedented move was widely regarded as a "surprise" and a "political earthquake" as it marked the first time that a member of the Thai royal family would become a candidate in electoral politics.

However, King Vajiralongkorn issued a statement on the same day, prohibiting Princess Ubolratana from entering politics, stating that despite relinquishing her official status as royalty to marry a United States citizen in the past, she still has maintained close ties with the Royal Family and worked under the name of the monarchy, and it is against tradition, norms and culture to bring members of the Royal Family into politics.

On 13 February 2019, Election Commission of Thailand submitted the request to the Constitutional Court for considering dissolution of the party for bringing members of the Royal Family into politics. The party was then dissolved with immediate effect on 7 March 2019 by the order of the Constitutional Court and its leaders banned from politics for a decade, citing customary law.

References

External links 
 

Political parties established in 2009
Defunct political parties in Thailand
2009 establishments in Thailand
Political parties disestablished in 2019
Banned political parties in Thailand